Dustbowl is a band originating in Athens, Greece. The group was founded in 2006 by guitarist Nick Fysakis and has featured various other members.

The band has released three studio albums, the latest being "The Great Fandango", released in May 2016. They have collaborated with various other musicians both in the studio and during live performances.

In November 2017 Dustbowl performed live with The Dream Syndicate in Athens.

Discography

Studio albums 
 2008 Troublebound & Lonesome (Onstage Records)
 2009 Goin' Down (Fuzz Overdose Records)
 2016 The Great Fandango (Urban Sounds Records)

Singles  
 2014 Suicide Avenue/Winter's Almost Gone (Dusty Records)
 2014 Black River's Chest [The Burden Revisited]/Flamin' Rose (Dusty Records)

External links
Local press review (Greek)
Local press review (Greek)
Local press review (Greek)

References

Musical groups from Athens